Herrlich is a German surname. Notable people with the surname include:

Heiko Herrlich (born 1971), German footballer and manager
Horst Herrlich (1937–2015), German mathematician
Lotte Herrlich (1883–1956), German photographer

German-language surnames